The Be the Influence Wheelchair Rugby Tri-Nations is a wheelchair rugby tournament that took place on 18–20 September 2013 at St Mary’s Cathedral Square, Sydney. Three nations competed in the tournament, they were the United States of America, New Zealand and Australia. The USA won the tournament by defeating Australia in the final.

Tournament

Preliminary round

Semifinal

Final

References

Wheelchair rugby competitions
International rugby union competitions hosted by Australia
2013 in wheelchair rugby
2013 in Australian rugby union
2013 in New Zealand rugby union
2013 in American rugby union